is a Japanese former international table tennis player.

He won seven World Table Tennis Championships medals; fours silver medals and three bronze medals. His doubles partners were Nobuhiko Hasegawa and Sachiko Yokota.

After retiring from table tennis he studied sports science at the Osaka Sports University and became a noted sports scientist.

See also
 List of table tennis players
 List of World Table Tennis Championships medalists

References

1947 births
Japanese male table tennis players
Living people
World Table Tennis Championships medalists